Pierrette Perrin (died 1794), was a French industrialist.  After the death of her husband Claude Perrin in 1748, she developed his company in to one of the biggest faience-factories in France in Marseilles, with export internationally to both the Middle East, the West Indies and Latin America.

References

1794 deaths
18th-century French businesswomen
18th-century French businesspeople
Year of birth unknown
French industrialists